Saarbrücken Ost station is a station in Saarbrücken, the capital of the German state of Saarland, which is served by Regional-Express and Regionalbahn services.

History
The breakpoint was built to connect the districts of Rotenbühl, Kaninchenberg, Sankt Arnual and Eschberg to the local rail network. However, it has lost importance over time. In 1997, platform tracks 3 and 4 were closed for passenger services. Track 3 was converted into a terminating track.

Architecture
The station has been classified as a Haltepunkte (roughly “halt”)  since 1960. The entrance building is about four metres high and nine metres wide. It has an entrance to tracks 1 and 2, but the entrance to platform 3 and 4 is closed.

Rail services
Saarbrücken Ost station is served by the following lines:

Notes

Railway stations in the Saarland
Buildings and structures in Saarbrücken